The 1937 Nevada Wolf Pack football team was an American football team that represented the University of Nevada in the Far Western Conference (FWC) during the 1937 college football season. In their second season under head coach Doug Dashiell, the team compiled a 2–6 record (1–3 against conference opponents) and finished fourth in the conference.

Schedule

References

Nevada
Nevada Wolf Pack football seasons
Nevada Wolf Pack football